Determination is a positive feeling that involves persevering towards a difficult goal.

Determination may also refer to:

 Determination (God Forbid album), 2001
 Determination (Tommy Emmanuel album), 1992
 Determinations (band), a Japanese reggae and ska band
 "Determination", a track from the soundtrack of the 2015 video game Undertale by Toby Fox

See also 
 Self-determination (disambiguation)